"Düm Tek Tek" is a song by Belgian-Turkish singer Hadise that was performed as the  entry for the Eurovision Song Contest 2009 in Moscow, Russia.

The song was performed 9th at the first semi-final of the contest on 12 May, following 's Lovebugs with "The Highest Heights" and preceding 's Noa and Mira Awad with "There Must Be Another Way" and finished 2nd with 172 points. It was performed 18th at the final of the contest on 16 May, following 's Alex Swings Oscar Sings! with "Miss Kiss Kiss Bang" and preceding 's Kejsi Tola with "Carry Me in Your Dreams" and finished 4th with 177 points.

Release
Düm Tek Tek was revealed during TRT's special New Year's Eve show in Turkey, which was broadcast both online through TRT International and on television.

Reception
In Belgium, "Düm Tek Tek" entered the Ultratop 50 (Flanders) at 36, where it stayed for a week before dropping out of the charts. It briefly became number one, defeating "Poker Face" by Lady Gaga. It also entered the Ultratop 50 (Wallonia) at 27, marking Hadise's first appearance on any Walloon chart.

Eurovision Song Contest 2009
"Düm Tek Tek" was chosen by Turkish Radio and Television Corporation (TRT). Hadise had prepared three songs as candidates for the contest, which she submitted to TRT for consideration.

She started off her promo tour in Malta, appearing on 5 popular television shows including the National Final of Malta in which their entry for the Eurovision Song Contest 2009, "What If We" by Chiara, was chosen. Her second destination was the National Final of Greece in which their entry for the Eurovision Song Contest 2009, "This Is Our Night" by Sakis Rouvas, was chosen. Then she started her Balkan tour in Komotini, Greece, followed by Skopje, Macedonia. She also visited Albania, Montenegro, Bulgaria, Romania and Moldova.

In a reaction to the first semi-final, Hadise said it is a miracle that she made it to the final as she was sick. In reaction to her birth country Belgium not making it to the final, she said that she represented both countries (Turkey and Belgium) and that she always felt a sense of belonging to both.

The song finished the contest placing 4th with 177 points overall.

Style and lyrical content
The lyrics of "Düm Tek Tek" were written by Hadise, Sinan Akçıl and Stefaan Fernande, while the music was composed by Akçıl. The song resembles the previous winning Turkish song "Everyway That I Can", in the sense that both are up-tempo songs with a "Turkish flavor" (though the lyrics suggest it is a love song). The song itself is performed in English, with the hook being in Turkish. "Düm tek tek" is a phrase formed by the Turkish music instrument darbuka, so it cannot readily be translated into other languages, though it has been said that "boom bang bang" is one English equivalent. It has been described as a "rhythmic pattern of Turkish music which is similar to vals in western music". In the song, "düm tek tek" are words symbolizing heartbeats:

Can you feel the rhythm in my heart?
The beat's going Düm Tek Tek!

Music video

During the month of March, a music video for "Düm Tek Tek" was shot. Snippets of the "Düm Tek Tek" video were shown during news broadcasts on VRT and Vtm, in Belgium, showing Hadise dancing within flame-like figures. The version of the song featured in the music video differs to the original as it has a new, more lively beat. The music video was edited in several ways, resulting in three different versions of the video being presented to TRT; one of the three was later leaked on the internet. The selected music video for "Düm Tek Tek" was set to premiere during the TRT news on March 15 however, the video release was postponed as it was said TRT was unable to decide; it was later revealed that TRT decided to send the video which was shot for TRT's New Year's Eve show.

Controversy
When the music video for "Dum Tek Tek" was leaked on the internet, it was labelled as being too erotic, and was thought to be the reason why TRT did not release it, however Hadise's manager Süheyl Atay denied these claims and was quoted as saying: "TRT has no attitudes or enforcements restricting the productivity of the artist like it has never had up to now. The claims appearing on the Turkish press since 22nd March 2009 do not reflect the reality."
Atay said that the montage process of the clip was still going on and the clip asserted to be the official one was only one of the three clip samples being delivered to TRT. "As can be understood from the quality of the images, the clip is not the final official version of the video clip. The process is going on, and the real clip will be made public by TRT as soon as possible."

Track listings
Belgian – Single
 "Düm Tek Tek" – 3:02

Turkish – EP
 "Düm Tek Tek" – 3:03
 "Deli Oğlan" – 3:11
 "Stir Me Up" – 3:28
 "Aşkkolik" – 4:05
 "A Good Kiss" – 3:11

Japanese – EP
 "Düm Tek Tek" – 3:02
 "My Body (Radio Edit)" – 3:07
 "Düm Tek Tek (Club Mix)" – 4:02
 "My Body (Lotion Remix)" – 5:03

Release history

Chart performance
"Düm Tek Tek" topped the Flemish Chart in Belgium and stayed at the top for 3 weeks, spending a total of 12 weeks on the chart. Also in Wallonia the song reached #24 and stayed on the charts
for 5 weeks. In the Greek Billboard Chart, the song spent 8 weeks on the chart with a peak position of #2. The song is also successful in Scandinavia. It charted in Swedish Singles Chart and reached #12, in the Finnish Official Download Chart it peaked #29. The song also reached #70 in the German Singles Chart, #73 in the Swiss Singles Chart, and #99 in the Dutch Singles Chart. In Russia, the song started rotation on May 28, and peaked #400 on its first day, consequently it succeeded number #251. The song also entered the UK Singles Chart on May 30, with a peak position of #127. Due to the popularity of the song in the European countries' charts, the song succeeded to chart in Eurochart Hot 100 Singles and peaked there #64. "Düm Tek Tek" has not charted in the Turkish Charts yet. The song is playing on both the radios which play Turkish music and foreign music. So the song's charted list is unknown.

After the Eurovision Song Contest 2009, "Düm Tek Tek" gained popularity on iTunes across Europe, in countries such as Denmark, France, Germany, Luxembourg, the Netherlands, Norway and the United Kingdom, where the song entered the iTunes Top 100.

The ringtone of "Düm Tek Tek" already was a smash hit in Japan. On 5 August Hadise's Eurovision Song Contest entry was also released on single in Japan. EMI Music Japan released a TV commercial and a Japanese Hadise website to promote the Belgian-Turkish singer, which made the song a hit in the Japanese charts.
The ringtone charts in Japan had already proved that the sound of "Düm Tek Tek" appealed to Japanese public.

A cover version in Afrikaans was released in South Africa by Andriette.

Charts

See also 
Ultratop 50 number-one hits of 2009

References

Eurovision songs of Turkey
Eurovision songs of 2009
Hadise songs
2009 singles
Ultratop 50 Singles (Flanders) number-one singles
English-language Turkish songs
Songs written by Hadise
2009 songs
EMI Records singles
Virgin Records singles